Nagaybaksky District is an administrative and municipal district (raion), one of the twenty-seven in Chelyabinsk Oblast, Russia. It is located in the south of the oblast. Its administrative center is the rural locality (a selo) of Fershampenuaz. Population:  24,310 (2002 Census);  The population of Fershampenuaz accounts for 20.9% of the district's total population.

Symbols
The coat of arms and flag of Nagaybaksky District consists of two wheat stalks holding a sword on a blue field, symbolizing an agrarian population serving for the protection of other agrarians from nomads. The blue field symbolizes their Turkic steppe origin.

References

Notes

Sources

Districts of Chelyabinsk Oblast
